The 2010 National Club Baseball Association (NCBA) Division I World Series was played at City of Palms Park in Fort Myers, FL from May 28 to June 3. The tenth tournament's champion was Colorado State University. This was Colorado State's sixth title in the last seven years and third in a row. The Most Valuable Player was Tommy Johnson of Colorado State University.

Format
The format is similar to the NCAA College World Series in that eight teams participate in two four-team double elimination brackets with the only difference being that in the NCBA, there is only one game that decides the national championship rather than a best-of-3 like the NCAA.

Participants

Results

Bracket

Game Results

Championship Game

See also
2010 NCBA Division I Tournament
2010 NCBA Division II World Series
2010 NCBA Division II Tournament

References

2010 in baseball
Baseball competitions in Fort Myers, Florida
National Club Baseball Association
NCBA Division I